Briallen Hopper is an American writer and literature scholar. She is the author of the collection Hard to Love: Essays and Confessions, published February 5, 2019. Hopper is an assistant professor in the English department of Queens College, City University of New York, where she teaches writing.

Early life 
Briallen Hopper grew up as one of six siblings in an evangelical Christian household. As a teenager she loved 19th-century novels by women, including authors like Louisa May Alcott, George Eliot, the Bronte sisters, Jane Austen, Elizabeth Gaskell: "They all write so intensely about young women becoming adults and I took it all to heart."

Hopper began her higher education at Tacoma Community College, where she also began teaching, tutoring English and ESL as a work-study job. She transferred to the University of Puget Sound. She earned a PhD from Princeton in 2008.

Career 
Following her PhD, Hopper enrolled at Yale Divinity School as the 2008 academic hiring freeze made securing a full-time academic post newly difficult. The experience of writing sermons encouraged her to experiment with writing for a broad audience and Hopper began writing popular essays, published in the Huffington Post and the Los Angeles Review of Books. She eventually left divinity school but remained at Yale, serving as an adjunct teaching writing. She was subsequently hired as an assistant professor in the English Department at Queens College, CUNY, teaching writing.

Hopper also works as an editor, of the online religion and culture magazine Killing The Buddha and the publishing house And Other Stories.

Hard to Love 
In 2019, Hopper published a collection of 21 essays on relationships entitled Hard to Love: Essays and Confessions. Writing in the Observer, Lauren LeBlanc called Hard to Love "an incredibly thoughtful examination of the various ways we depend upon others, through an expansive and engaging look at love outside a traditional romantic sphere." Rejecting the "single versus partner binary" as the primary question of relationships, Hopper's book instead focuses, in LeBlanc's description, on "the unsung ways that we support and encourage one another." Hopper discusses caring for a friend going through chemotherapy, the possibility of single motherhood, and her ambivalence about the 2018 Women's March, among other topics relating to relationships outside of romantic partnership.

Publishers Weekly praised Hopper's style as "a voice that is sophisticated and analytical, but also earnest and eager". In the Los Angeles Review of Books, Ellen Wayland-Smith wrote that "what Hopper does so artfully in her work is to disrupt the foregone narrative conclusions imposed on American women," turning away (if not initially by choice) from the "plot-driven love — clocks both nuptial and biological — Hopper learned to let herself float in the immediacy and plotlessness of her friendships." Kirkus Reviews named it a Best Memoir of the Year and CBC named it a Best International Nonfiction Book of the Year.

Other writing 
Hopper contributed an essay to Meghan O'Rourke’s collection on life in the spring of 2020 during the COVID-19 pandemic, A World Out of Reach. Hopper wrote about living in Elmhurst, Queens, a blue-collar neighborhood devastated by the virus.

References 

Living people
21st-century American women writers
Queens College, City University of New York faculty
University of Puget Sound alumni
Yale Divinity School alumni
Princeton University alumni
American women essayists
21st-century American essayists
Year of birth missing (living people)